Milad Meydavoudi (born 20 January 1985 in Masjed Soleyman) is an Iranian football player, who last played for Naft Masjed Soleyman in Persian Gulf Pro League. He was appointed as assistant coach of Khooshe Talaei Saveh F.C.

Club career
Meydavoudi started his career at Esteghlal Ahvaz with whom he made his professional debut in 2004. He was brought to Esteghlal Ahvaz by Nasser Hejazi from youth team.
In the next season he played for Pas Tehran because of army services and quickly emerged as a promising youngster, before moving back to Esteghlal Ahvaz for the 2006–07 season.

On February 1, 2008 Meydavoudi signed a 4-month loan contract with UAE League side Al-Ahli for a transfer fee of $600,000.

On February 8, 2008 Meydavoudi signed a 2.5-year contract extension with Esteghlal Ahvaz which kept him at the Takhti Stadium until 2010. But on September 22, 2008 he signed a 1-year contract with Al-Ahli for a transfer fee of $1,000,000. In 2010, he joined Esteghlal where he scored two goals in his debut. In November 2010, Meydavoudi was injured possibly for the remainder of the 2010–11 season. In winter 2013, Meydavoudi joined Aluminium returning with his former coach Parviz Mazloomi. After Aluminium's relegation to the Azadegan League, he joined Esteghlal Khuzestan. On 1 June 2014 he joined Saipa, signing a two-year contract on 19 June 2014.

Club career statistics

 Assist Goals

International career
He was a member of Iran national under-20 football team at the 2004 AFC Youth Championship. He was called up to the Iran national football team in June 2007 for the West Asian Football Federation Championship 2007. He made his debut for Team Melli in Iran's first match against Iraq. He scored his first national goal in Iran's second match against Palestine.

International goals 
Scores and results list Iran's goal tally first.

Honours

Club
Pas Tehran
Iran Pro League Runner-up: 2005–06

Esteghlal Ahvaz
Iran Pro League Runner-up: 2006–07

Al-Ahli
UAE Pro League: 2008–09

Esteghlal
Iran Pro League Runner-up: 2010–011
Hazfi Cup: 2011–12

Country
Iran
WAFF Championship: 2007
WAFF Championship: 2008

References

External links

Iranian footballers
Iran international footballers
Iranian expatriate footballers
Association football forwards
Esteghlal F.C. players
Pas players
Esteghlal Ahvaz players
Esteghlal Khuzestan players
Persian Gulf Pro League players
UAE Pro League players
1985 births
Living people
Al Ahli Club (Dubai) players
Aluminium Hormozgan F.C. players
Saipa F.C. players
People from Masjed Soleyman
Naft Masjed Soleyman F.C. players
Sportspeople from Khuzestan province